Harviell is an unincorporated community and census-designated place in Butler County, Missouri, United States. As of the 2020 census it had a population of 98.

History
Harviell was founded in 1873 and is named for Simeon Harviell, an early citizen. A post office called Harviell has been in operation since 1874.

Geography

Demographics

References

Census-designated places in Butler County, Missouri
Unincorporated communities in Butler County, Missouri
Unincorporated communities in Missouri
Census-designated places in Missouri